A Greenwich Pensioner was the Naval equivalent of a Chelsea Pensioner.

Although the initial concept of a Greenwich pensioner was that of someone living in the Royal Hospital Greenwich, the institution became responsible for the payment of pensions in 1804 (taking over the responsibility from the Chatham Chest). The Royal Hospital for Seaman, as it was originally called, now the Old Royal Naval College, has been described as "poshest pensioners home that ever was".

It was permissible for "out-pensioners" to apply for entry to Greenwich, thereby relinquishing their out-pension.

In common with the union workhouses of the 19th century, the families of the men were not allowed to reside with the men. If a resident wished to leave the hospital, they were free to do so. If they wanted to re-enter, they would have to wait until a year had passed.

The residents were bound by militarised rules and regulations. Like their contemporaries at Chelsea, they wore a uniform of tricorne hats, albeit with blue coats. Pensioners who broke the rules would have to wear a yellow coat, known as a "canary", and would have to perform menial tasks while wearing this garment. Greenwich pensioners adopted a standardised uniform long before the Royal Navy.

Greenwich pensioners were in residence from 1705 to 1869, and acquired the nickname "Greenwich geese" from the townspeople of Greenwich. The lifestyle of Greenwich Pensioners is presented as part of the Discover Greenwich Visitor Centre in the Pepys Building.

References

External links
Greenwich Pensioners website
Chelsea Pensioners website

1692 establishments in England
1869 disestablishments in England
History of the Royal Borough of Greenwich
Retirement in the United Kingdom
History of the Royal Navy
Veterans' affairs in the United Kingdom